Isabelle Demongeot and Elna Reinach were the defending champions but only Reinach competed that year with Andrea Strnadová.

Reinach and Strnadová lost in the semifinals to Jenny Byrne and Julie Richardson.

Patricia Hy and Mercedes Paz won in the final 6–4, 7–6(7–3) against Byrne and Richardson.

Seeds
Champion seeds are indicated in bold text while text in italics indicates the round in which those seeds were eliminated.

 Inés Gorrochategui /  Caroline Vis (semifinals)
 Elna Reinach /  Andrea Strnadová (semifinals)
 Jenny Byrne /  Julie Richardson (final)
 Patricia Hy /  Mercedes Paz (champions)

Draw

External links
 ITF tournament edition details
 WTA tournament draws

WTA Auckland Open
1994 WTA Tour